An egg sandwich is a sandwich with some kind of cooked egg filling. Fried eggs, scrambled eggs, omelette, sliced boiled eggs and egg salad (a mix of chopped cooked egg and mustard and mayonnaise) are popular options. In the fifth case, it may be called an egg salad sandwich.

History of egg sandwiches

Fried egg sandwich

Beyond the basic model of fried egg between slices of bread, many common sandwiches have variations that include a fried egg in addition to bacon, sausage, cheese, black pudding, cold cuts, or as another topping to a hamburger. A popular breakfast sandwich in New Jersey consists of a fried egg, pork roll, and American cheese on a roll. The Southern egg sandwich is an egg and cheese sandwich, with bacon and avocado as additions. 

A popular filling snack with British troops since at least World War I, the "egg banjo" is a sandwich of a runny fried egg between two thick slices of bread (if possible, buttered or with margarine), often accompanied by a mug of "gunfire" (a drink of tea and rum). A popular account of the term's origins is the act of cleaning spilt egg off one's body, the sandwich held out to the side with one hand whilst the other wipes at the drips, giving the impression of playing an invisible banjo.

Boiled egg sandwich

A 1905 British cookbook describes an "egg sandwich" made with sliced hard-boiled eggs, marinated in oil, vinegar, salt, and pepper, and garnished with minced watercress. An "egg and chutney sandwich" is made from chutney and minced hard-boiled eggs; an "egg cream" sandwich from hard-boiled eggs pounded into a smooth paste and seasoned with anchovies and mustard. A common alternative is to mash the hard-boiled egg together with mayonnaise, salt and black pepper, usually called simply egg spread, or an egg mayonnaise or egg mayo. Cress is often seen as the typical accompaniment to an egg sandwich. Salad cream is also a common alternative to mayonnaise, mainly within the UK. In Scandinavia and Finland, boiled egg and kaviar is a common topping on sandwiches.

Egg salad sandwich

It is also common, in the United States, to use egg salad as a sandwich filling.

History as fast food

Prompted by meat rationing during World War II, manager Bruce LaPlante  introduced the first fast food egg dish with a fried egg sandwich at a St. Louis White Castle. However, the dish was unpopular, and was abandoned as soon as wartime meat rationing was lifted. Fast food restaurants did not begin serving egg dishes again until the 1970s, starting with the McDonald's Egg McMuffin, invented in 1971 by a McDonald's franchisee in Santa Barbara, California.

See also

 Eggs Benedict, a form of open-faced egg sandwich
 Creamed eggs on toast
 McMuffin, a popular fast-food breakfast egg sandwich
 Breakfast sandwich, a general article about sandwiches served at breakfast, including the egg sandwich
 List of egg dishes
 List of sandwiches

References

External links